Nyssonotus is a genus of true weevils in the beetle family Curculionidae. There are at least two described species in Nyssonotus.

Species
These two species belong to the genus Nyssonotus:
 Nyssonotus angustus Hustache, 1932
 Nyssonotus seriatus Casey, 1892

References

Further reading

 
 
 

Cossoninae
Articles created by Qbugbot